Nicolás Teodoro Machado Mira (born January 3, 1997) is a Uruguayan professional footballer who plays as a centre forward for Centro Atlético Fénix in the Uruguayan Primera División.

Club career
Machado started his career playing with River Plate. He made his professional debut during the 2015/16 season.

In the summer 2019, Machado was one out of several Uruguayan players who joined Spanish club Zamudio SD. In 2020, he returned to Uruguay and joined Centro Atlético Fénix.

References

1997 births
Living people
Uruguayan footballers
Uruguayan expatriate footballers
Association football forwards
Club Atlético River Plate (Montevideo) players
Villa Teresa players
Llaneros F.C. players
Zamudio SD players
Centro Atlético Fénix players
Uruguayan Primera División players
Uruguayan Segunda División players
Categoría Primera B players
Footballers from Paysandú
Uruguayan expatriate sportspeople in Colombia
Uruguayan expatriate sportspeople in Spain
Expatriate footballers in Colombia
Expatriate footballers in Spain